Gentleman of the Horse was a position in the stables department of the British Royal Court, subordinate only to the Master of the Horse.  It existed from 1693 until abolished in 1782, and carried a salary of £256.

The post was revived in 1828, with a salary of £500.  The title of the post was subsequently changed to Crown Equerry.

List of Gentlemen of the Horse

Before 1782
1691–1702: Henry Ireton
1702–1708: William Walsh
1708–1710: Thomas Meredyth
1710–1717: Conyers Darcy
1717–1736: Hon. Henry Berkeley
1737–1746: Hon. James Brudenell
1747–1760: Hon. William Keppel
1760–1782: Richard Berenger
Post abolished in 1782

After 1828
Post revived in 1828
1828–1830: Emilius Henry Delmé-Radcliffe
1830–1837: Lord Frederick FitzClarence

References 
R.O. Bucholz, 'The stables: Gentleman of the Horse ', Office-Holders in Modern Britain: Volume 11 (revised): Court Officers, 1660–1837 (2006), pp. 605. . Date accessed: 26 October 2008

Positions within the British Royal Household
Lists of office-holders in the United Kingdom